The University of La Salette is a private Catholic, coeducational basic and higher education institution run by the Missionaries of Our Lady of La Salette in Santiago City, Philippines. It was founded by the La Salettes in June, 1951. It is one of the top performing universities in the region.

The Missionaries of Our Lady of La Salette, mandated by Msgr. Constancio Jurgens, Bishop of Tuguegarao, Cagayan, Philippines, to establish an educational complex as a response to the urgent need of the people in Isabela, opened La Salette of Santiago, a high school in 1950. In consonance with the growing need of the people for higher education, La Salette of Santiago moved up to College level with the assistance of the Maryknoll Sisters. In 1957, Rev. Fr. Jose R. Nacu, M.S., the first Filipino Missionary of Our Lady of La Salette, ordained priest of Fall River, Massachusetts, became the first Filipino rector of La Salette of Santiago College. Eventually, in 1998, La Salette of Santiago was raised to a university level under the leadership of Rev. Fr. Romeo Gonzales, M.S., Ph.D.

Known for its charism Reconciliation (Reconciliare), the main campus of the University of La Salette is located in Santiago City, with an extension campus in Silang, Cavite, Philippines. The span of its operation covers the vast southern Isabela province with extension offices in various towns for summer courses.

At present, the University Hospital has a 350-bed capacity , tertiary hospital with a budget of 650 million pesos is under construction to cater for the growing demands for the healthcare in the region.

History 

The University of La Salette was established in June 1951 as a high school, and initially offered two courses: Secretarial Science and Arts. In March 1953, the school held its first graduation in Secretarial Science. Due to a lack of qualified instructors, the Bachelor of Science in Education course was temporarily suspended, but was re-opened in 1963–1964, and Bachelor of Science in Elementary Education was also offered that same year.

During the 1968–69 school years, La Salette of Santiago, Inc. gained membership in the Catholic Educational Association of the Philippines (CEAP). In 1970, the college department was moved from the high school campus to its present site to cope with the unprecedented increase in college enrollment. In 1972, the Ministry of Education Culture and Sports (MECS) granted government recognition for the Degree of Bachelor of Science in business administration.

In 1974, during the last year of management by the Maryknoll Sisters at La Salette of Santiago, Inc., the college was granted accreditation by the Philippine Accrediting Association of Schools Colleges and Universities (PAASCU), making it the first PAASCU accredited school in the Province of Isabela, second in Cagayan Valley and 19th in the Philippines.

Towards the end of 1974, the Religious of the Assumption took over the administration of La Salette College and the high school, and the La Salette Panangutan Center was created in response to the challenge of Christian service particularly the poor in the locality. The university also underwent renovations; the library was transferred to a new location, more buildings were constructed for new facilities, a proper accounting system was installed for the Business Office, and the faculty and Staff Development Program was strengthened and research and outreach activities were undertaken.

In 1979, The Daughters of Charity were invited to help in the school's management. Sometime between 1982 and 1987, the University of La Salette partnered with Computer Exponents Inc. to introduce Computer Education, and two years later the university assumed full responsibility over the program after MECS approved the integration of Computer Education in all courses of the college.

The Child Learning Center was opened in 1983, and served as a training center for the Bachelor in Elementary Education (BEE) student interns. DECS granted government recognition of the Preschool and Basic Elementary Education programs two years later.

Cognizant of the professional needs of the teachers in the La Salette School System as well as in other schools in the region, the Graduate School opened in 1984 with Master of Arts in Development Education. In the same school year, a five-year Civil Engineering course was also offered in the undergraduate level.

The High School Department, likewise, continued to update and upgrade its standard. It embarked on the rigorous process of self-assessment which resulted in the first formal survey of Philippine Accrediting Association of Schools Colleges and Universities (PAASCU) in 1984. The high school was granted its initial accreditation for a period of three years on March 22, 1985, making it the first accredited high school in Region 2. That same year, on June 17, 1985, the degree of Master of Arts in Development Education was granted government recognition.

However, a major tragedy which affected the whole institution struck on March 25, 1986. A fire of undetermined origin razed to the ground the main building of the High School Department. The fire destroyed 19 classrooms, 5 administrative offices, a large faculty room, and a storeroom where audio-visual equipment, textbooks, industrial arts tools and machines and other school supplies, were kept. However, believing in maintaining and supporting the high standard of instruction which the school has committed to continue, the local community, through the leadership of the Home-School Association and Alumni Association worked extensively with the school administration in building new classrooms.

February 13, 1987, marked the promotion of La Salette College from Level II to Level III Accredited status by both PAASCU and FAAP, an honor that made La Salette College the first Level III accredited school in Region 02. The four-year Bachelor of Science in Secretarial Administration was also granted government recognition on July 27, 1987. In school year 1986–87, the president was appointed by Fund for Assistance to Private Education (FAPE) to take Management of FAPE-funded government projects such as the Secondary Education Development Program (SEDP), the Educational Service Contracting (ESC) and the Tuition Fee Supplement for all private High Schools in the region.

Despite limited funds, the administrators started the construction of the multi-purpose building named Our Lady of the Miraculous Medal Building which at present houses the following: Chapel, Library, Audio-Visual Room, Offices of the Deans of Education, Liberal Arts, and Engineering, the Central Supply Room, Demonstration Room, the Model Clinic for the Nursing and Midwifery departments, the Drafting Room, the Hydraulic and Physics Laboratories, the Lawrence Conference Hall, a Dormitory and classrooms. Today, the extension of the Our Lady of the Miraculous Medal Building houses more classrooms for the growing population, the Graduate School Library, the Physical therapy Laboratories, and the centralized Laboratories in Biology, Chemistry, and Zoology. The college also acquired an additional lot of two hectares to anticipate future expansion programs as indicated in the five-year plan.

In school year 1987–1988, there was a need for the creation of the position of a vice-president to assist the president in administration. To manifest its commitment to sustain quality Christian education, the College Department renewed its accreditation status as Level III by PAASCU and FAAP in 1989. In the same year, the college opened the Criminology Course to respond to the development needs of the region in terms of peace and order which is a very crucial component of rural development. The following year, the degree on Master in Business Management was added to the Graduate School Program.

Similarly, to meet the demand for adequate health services and technology in the local community and in the region, the Midwifery course was offered in 1992, followed by the Bachelor of Science in Nursing in 1993, Bachelor of Science in Geodetic Engineering, Master in Public Administration and Doctor of Philosophy (Educational Management) in 1994. The school year 1993–1994 marked the second PAASCU re-accreditation of the High School Department for a period of five years thereby raising its accreditation level to Level II.

In July 1994, the College President Fr. Romeo B. Gonzales, MS, PhD, filed the application for the conversion of the college into a university. The college in its desire to be of greater service to other schools in the region, developed and opened its physical facilities for provincial and regional conferences/seminar-workshops of schools and government agencies. This year was also the height of the strong leadership and involvement of the college in various educational activities in the region.

In school year 1995–96, curricular expansion was made with the opening of the Bachelor of Science in Physical Therapy (BSPT), the Bachelor of Science in Computer Information System (BSCIS), Bachelor of Science in Psychology, Bachelor of Science in Mathematics and the integration of computer in all courses. Adjacent lots at 1.5 hectares were purchased for expansion.

Constant follow-up was made by the administration with regards to its application for university status. During the first semester of school year 1996–1997, a team from the Commission on Higher Education (CHED) Regional Office was sent to assess the capability and qualification of the college to become a university. Sometime in February 1997, a team from the CHED National Office was organized and sent to La Salette College to make follow-up assessment and to make recommendations to the commissioners on the status of La Salette College for becoming a university. The Honorable Commissioner Mona D. Valisno, Managing Commissioner and Oversight Commissioner for Luzon, was invited by La Salette College as the Commencement Speaker in March 1997. This provided the time and venue for the commissioner to see for herself the curricular programs, the extension services and the research services of La Salette College.

In school year 1997–1998, two big computer laboratories with Local Area Network (LAN) were provided to keep up with the development of Information Technology. Expansion of the Our Lady of Miraculous Medal building was constructed to provide more classrooms for the growing population.

Series of visits of the three CHED Commissioners were made in November 1997. It was hoped that the University Charter will be awarded in January 1998 during the Golden Jubilee Celebration of the Presence of the Missionaries of Our Lady of La Salette in the Philippines (1948–1998). However, the administration was required to comply with three recommendations: the improvement of the facade, the Internet connection and the development and production of more research studies. The administration exerted effort to respond to these demands. Before the start of school year 1997–98, the administration signed the Memorandum of Agreement with Fund for Assistance to Private Education (FAPENet) for internet connection and services.

In February 1998, the College of Nursing and College of Engineering went through preliminary survey for accreditation by PAASCU. The long-awaited dream of becoming a UNIVERSITY was realized on June 25, 1998. Formal inauguration and awarding of the University Charter was held. Fr. Romeo B. Gonzales, MS, Ph.D. who has served the college since 1979 to the present was installed as the first University President.

The challenge of being a university continues to inspire the administration to update and expand the curricular programs. It has established several Graduate School extension classes in the Provinces of Cagayan and Isabela through its Center for Alternative Learning in order to respond to the call for borderless education and community service. The University of La Salette was one of the universities in Region 02 which was deputized by the Commission on Higher Education (CHED) Manila to implement the Expanded Tertiary Education Equivalency and Accreditation Program (ETEEAP). The Memorandum of Agreement was signed by the University President and Commissioner Mona D. Valisno on May 19, 1999.

Today, University of La Salette, with its population close to four thousand, stands with pride in serving the youth of Santiago City, Province of Isabela and the entire Cagayan Valley. In pursuit of academic excellence, Christian formation, leadership and service, University of La Salette continues to offer well-rounded education that provides an opportunity for self-realization and actualization. Each one is called to continue to live by heart the message of Our Lady of La Salette for conversion, prayer and zeal and to make her message known to all people.

Academic Programs

Graduate Programs 
 Doctor in Business Administration
 Doctor in Public Administration
 Doctor of Philosophy in Educational Management
 Doctor of Philosophy in Education
 Major in Science Education
 Master in Business Management
 Master of Arts in Education
 Major in: English, Educational Management, Filipino, Mathematics, Guidance and Counseling, Science, Physical Education, Peace and Reconciliation Studies
 Master of Arts in Nursing
 Major in: Nursing Service Administration
 Master of Science in Nursing
 Major in: Community Health Nursing, Medical-Surgical Nursing, and Maternal & Child Nursing
 Master of Arts in Criminology
 Master of Science in Engineering Management
 Master of Science in Library and Information Science
 Master of Science in Public Health
 Master of Science in Social Work
 Master of Information Technology

College of Law 
 Juris Doctor (Bachelor of Laws)

Undergraduate Programs 
College of Accountancy
 Bachelor of Science in Accountancy
 Bachelor of Science in Accounting Information System

College of Arts and Sciences
 Bachelor of Arts in Political Science
 Bachelor of Arts in Journalism
 Bachelor of Arts in Philosophy
 Bachelor of Science in Psychology
 Bachelor of Science in Social Work

College of Business Education
 Bachelor of Science in Business Administration
 Major in: Human Resources Management, Financial Management, Marketing Management
 Bachelor of Science in Office Administration
 Bachelor of Science in Hospitality Management
 Bachelor of Science in Tourism Management

College of Criminology
 Bachelor of Science in Criminology

College of Education
 Bachelor of Elementary Education
 Bachelor of Secondary Early Childhood Education
 Bachelor of Physical Education
 Bachelor of Secondary Education
 Major in: English, Filipino, Mathematics, Sciences, and Social Studies

College of Engineering and Architecture
 Bachelor of Science in Civil Engineering
 Bachelor of Science in Electronics Engineering
 Bachelor of Science in Computer Engineering
 Bachelor of Science in Architecture
 Bachelor of Science in Geodetic Engineering

College of Information Technology
 Bachelor of Science in Information Technology
 Bachelor of Library and Information Science

College of Medicine and Allied Medical Programs
 Bachelor of Science in Medical Laboratory Science
 Bachelor of Science in Radiologic Technology
 Bachelor of Science in Pharmacy
 Bachelor of Science in Physical Therapy

College of Nursing, Public Health, and Midwifery
 Bachelor of Science in Nursing
 Bachelor of Science in Midwifery
 Bachelor of Science in Public Health

Basic Education 
 Senior High
 Grade 11
 Grade 12

 Junior High
 Grade 1-6
 Kinder
 Nursery (Preschool)

References

External links

Catholic universities and colleges in the Philippines
Universities and colleges in Isabela (province)
Educational institutions established in 1951
Education in Santiago, Isabela
1951 establishments in the Philippines